Elias Nijmé, BA (16 August 1920 in Aleppo, Syria – 6 November 1998) was Archbishop of the Melkite Greek Catholic Archeparchy of Tripoli in Lebanon.

Auxiliary Bishop of Antioch

Elias Nijmé was ordained on 20 July 1944 Chaplain of the Aleppinian Basilian. His appointment as Archbishop "pro hac vice", Auxiliary Bishop in the Melkite Patriarchate of Antioch and Titular Archbishop of Palmyra of Greek Melkites was performed on August 16, 1971, and appointed. On September 5, 1971, Nijmé was consecrated by Patriarch of Antioch Maximos V Hakim and his co-consecrators were Archbishop Athanasios Toutoungi of Aleppo and Archbishop Grégoire Haddad of Beirut and Byblos.

Archbishop of Tripoli

On February 7, 1978 Nijmé was appointed to the Melkite Greek Catholic Archeparchy of Tripoli and served in Tripoli until his age-related retirement on August 5, 1995. He became Archbishop Emeritus until his death on November 6, 1998, and was the consecrator of the Melkite bishop Georges Kahhalé Zouhaïraty, BA, titular bishop of Abila Lysaniae and Apostolic Exarch of Venezuela.

References

External links
 http://www.catholic-hierarchy.org/bishop/bnijme.html

1920 births
1998 deaths
Melkite Greek Catholic bishops
Roman Catholic titular archbishops
20th-century Roman Catholic archbishops in Lebanon